Johannes "Hans" Belksma (19 October 1884, Tzum – 3 March 1942, Tana Toraja) was a Dutch missionary.

Belksma arrived in Tana Toraja, South Sulawesi, Dutch East Indies  in May 1916. There he was suggested by Gereformeerde Zendingsbond to build . Belksma established Normaalcursus in Tana Toraja.

References

1884 births
1942 deaths
Protestant missionaries in Indonesia
Dutch Protestant missionaries
20th-century Dutch East Indies people
Knights of the Order of Orange-Nassau
People from Franekeradeel